is a Japanese animation studio and production enterprise headquartered in Kamiogi, Suginami, Tokyo, and has animation studios in Kyoto and Osaka.

Establishment
Liden Films was founded on February 22, 2012 and, shortly after, joined joint-holding company Ultra Super Pictures, alongside studios Sanzigen, Trigger, and Ordet. The company is currently represented by Tetsurou Satomi.

In 2016, the Kyoto Studio produced its own series, and in 2020 the Osaka Studio did the same.

Works

Television series

Anime films
 New Initial D the Movie - Legend 1: Awakening (August 23, 2014) - co-animated with Sanzigen
 Cardfight!! Vanguard: The Movie (September 13, 2014)
 New Initial D the Movie - Legend 2: Racer (May 23, 2015) - co-animated with Sanzigen
 New Initial D the Movie - Legend 3: Dream (February 6, 2016) - co-animated with Sanzigen
 Monster Strike The Movie (December 12, 2016)
 Happy-Go-Lucky Days (October 23, 2020) - animated by Liden Films Kyoto Studio
 Farewell, My Dear Cramer: First Touch (June 11, 2021)
 Child of Kamiari Month (October 8, 2021)

OVA/ONAs
 Terra Formars: Bugs 2 (August 20, 2014 – November 28, 2014) - 2 episodes
 Yamada-kun and the Seven Witches (December 17, 2014 – May 15, 2015) - 2 episodes
 The Heroic Legend of Arslan (May 9, 2016 – November 9, 2016) – 2 episodes
 Monster Sonic! D'Artagnan's Rise to Fame (June 14, 2017 – July 19, 2017) – 5 episodes
 Monster Strike: A Rhapsody Called Lucy -The Very First Song- (2017) – 1 episode; animated by Liden Films Kyoto Studio
 Lost Song (March 31, 2018 – June 16, 2018) – co-production with Dwango, 12 episodes
 Terra Formars: Earth Arc (August 17, 2018 – November 19, 2018) – co-animated with Yumeta Company, 2 episodes
 Love and Lies (November 9, 2018) – 2 episodes
 Midnight Occult Civil Servants (September 25, 2019 – November 22, 2019) – 3 episodes
 Blade of the Immortal -Immortal- (October 10, 2019 – March 25, 2020) – 24 episodes
 Arad Senki: The Wheel of Reversal (April 23, 2020 – July 30, 2020) – 16 episodes
 Kotaro Lives Alone (March 10, 2022) – 10 episodes
 Bastard!! -Heavy Metal, Dark Fantasy- (June 30, 2022 – September 15, 2022) – 24 episodes

Notes

References

External links

 

 
Mass media companies established in 2012
Japanese companies established in 2012
Japanese animation studios
Animation studios in Tokyo
Suginami
Ultra Super Pictures